Gemr (initially Attic Gem) was a Nashua, New Hampshire-based online e-commerce social platform for collectors that raised a $4.9m Series A round of financing in November 2014.

Gemr acquired GoAntiques in May 2015, and later sold it in March 2018. In September 2017, Gemr signed a partnership agreement with Loot Anime to create the first officially branded club on the collector platform.

On January 27, 2020, Gemr announced it was shutting down after it was unable to get additional funding to keep the company going. A day later, on January 28 Gemr emailed its users suggesting they migrate to use hobbyDB.

References

External links
 GoAntiques site

Online retailers of the United States
Internet properties established in 2014
American companies established in 2014
Companies based in Portsmouth, New Hampshire
2014 establishments in New Hampshire